List of Monday Night Football results, may refer to:
 List of Monday Night Football results (1970–1989), Monday Night Football results from the years 1970 to 1989
 List of Monday Night Football results (1990–2009), Monday Night Football results from the years 1990 to 2009
 List of Monday Night Football results (2010–present), Monday Night Football results from the years 2010 to present
 List of NFL on ABC results, which includes games from Monday Night Football.

See also